Yunus Altun (born 25 August 1977 in Eyüp, Istanbul, Turkey) is a Turkish former professional footballer. He played as a striker.

References

1977 births
Living people
People from Eyüp
Turkish footballers
Hatayspor footballers
Kayserispor footballers
Konyaspor footballers
Çaykur Rizespor footballers
Elazığspor footballers
Malatyaspor footballers
Diyarbakırspor footballers
Bursaspor footballers
Mardinspor footballers
Kocaelispor footballers
Turanspor footballers
Karşıyaka S.K. footballers
Bucaspor footballers
Mersin İdman Yurdu footballers
Altay S.K. footballers
Footballers from Istanbul
Association football forwards